This is a list of the National Register of Historic Places listings in Deaf Smith County, Texas.

This is intended to be a complete list of properties and districts listed on the National Register of Historic Places in Deaf Smith County, Texas. There are one district and one individual property listed on the National Register in the county. The individual property is both a State Antiquities Landmark and a Recorded Texas Historic Landmark.

Current listings

The locations of National Register properties and districts may be seen in a mapping service provided.

|}

See also

National Register of Historic Places listings in Texas
Recorded Texas Historic Landmarks in Deaf Smith County

References

External links

Deaf Smith County, Texas
Deaf Smith County
Buildings and structures in Deaf Smith County, Texas